A fresnel is a unit of frequency equal to 1012 s−1. It was occasionally used in the field of spectroscopy, but its use has been superseded by terahertz (with the identical value 1012 hertz). It is named for Augustin-Jean Fresnel the physicist whose expertise in optics led to the creation of Fresnel lenses.

References

Units of frequency
Obsolete units of measurement
Non-SI metric units
Spectroscopy